The 1987 Sul America Open was a men's tennis tournament played on outdoor hard courts in Itaparica, Brazil that was part of the 1987 Nabisco Grand Prix. It was the second edition of the tournament and took place from 23 November through 29 November 1987. Eighth-seeded Andre Agassi, who entered on a wildcard, won the singles title.

Finals

Singles

 Andre Agassi defeated  Luiz Mattar 7–6, 6–2
 It was Agassi's first singles title of his career.

Doubles

 Sergio Casal /  Emilio Sánchez defeated  Jorge Lozano /  Diego Pérez 6–2, 6–2

References

Sul America Open
Sul America Open